The  is Japanese aerial lift line in Himeji, Hyōgo, operated by the city government. Opened in 1958, the line climbs Mount Shosha of Engyō-ji, a famous temple.

Basic data
Cable length: 
Vertical interval:

See also
List of aerial lifts in Japan

External links
 Official website

Aerial tramways in Japan
Transport in Himeji
1958 establishments in Japan